A life sentence is a term of imprisonment for a crime that is intended to last for life.

Life Sentence may also refer to:
 Life Sentence (TV series), an American TV series
 Life Sentence (EP), a 2003 EP by Epicure
 "Life Sentence" (Arrow), an episode of Arrow

See also 
 Life Sentence to Love, an album by Legal Weapon